The Paraavis Vityaz (Russian: "Витязь", English: "Knight") is a Russia paramotor, designed and produced by Paraavis of Moscow for powered paragliding. The aircraft is supplied complete and ready-to-fly.

Design and development
The Vityaz was designed to comply with the US FAR 103 Ultralight Vehicles rules as well as European regulations. It features a paraglider-style wing, single-place or two-place accommodation and a single engine in pusher configuration. Early versions were powered by a Zanzottera MZ 34  motor with a 2.5:1 ratio reduction drive and a  diameter two-bladed wooden propeller. The aircraft is built in two versions, one predominantly from aluminium and the other from titanium.

As is the case with all paramotors, take-off and landing is accomplished by foot. Inflight steering is accomplished via handles that actuate the canopy brakes, creating roll and yaw.

Specifications (Vityaz)

References

External links

Vityaz
2000s Russian ultralight aircraft
Single-engined pusher aircraft
Paramotors